The Alliance of Reformed Churches (the Alliance) is a community of Reformed congregations built for the 21st century. As an alliance, it serves a group of congregations who have chosen to ally with one another as friends and partners in Christ, seeking first the Kingdom of God with the presence and power of the Holy Spirit. it encourages Biblical Congregations - Joined Together Under Christ - Engaging in Mission. The Alliance is growing throughout the United States and engaging in conversations with likeminded churches around the globe.

History
In the 2010s, the Reformed Church in America (RCA) faced internal conflict to define its position on Biblical authority which led to increased differences among clergy and laity on issues of the divinity of Jesus, Jesus as the only way of salvation, and ultimately, the Biblical view of marriage. 

In 2021, a denominational report was adopted at the RCA's General Synod held in October of 2021. The report provided: a reaffirmation of the RCA commitment to having a Global Mission agency; to providing gracious separation for those congregations who desired to move forward by leaving the RCA; and, to restructuring the RCA “with a view to optimizing the RCA’s sustained spiritual and organizational health.”  (report not due until 2024).

Given the lack of agreement on Biblical authority and teaching along with the resolution to provide gracious separation, 45 congregations took immediate action to begin a new organization on January 1, 2022 when they would be received as the first congregations of the Alliance.

Doctrine
The Alliance has published its organizational convictions. 

The Alliance subscribes to the Apostles' Creed, Athanasian Creed and Niceno-Constantinopolitan Creed.

It also subscribes to the Heidelberg Catechism, the Belgic Confession, the Canons of Dort, the Belhar Confession and the Great Lakes Catechism on Marriage and Sexuality.

In their convictions, the Alliance states: "The core belief of the organization is that men and women are created in God’s image and are gifted by the Spirit to equip and lead God’s people for ministry. We maintain that there are two theologically acceptable positions regarding the interpretation of ordained offices. One position ordains women into the ordained offices of the church. The other limits the ordained offices in which women can serve. We respect each other and each other’s congregational choices regarding the nature of ordained leadership."

References

Reformed denominations in North America
Calvinist denominations established in the 21st century
Christian organizations established in 2021